Frank Evans (1 October 1930 – 6 February 2007) was an English jazz guitarist

Career 
Evans started playing guitar at the age of eleven. His first recording was with Tubby Hayes and Tony Coe on Jazz Tête à Tête in 1966. After years of touring, Evans focused on his career as a solo jazz guitarist and operated from his home town of Bristol. In the late 1970s, he started Blue Bag Records, releasing his albums Noctuary, Soiree, and ...For Little Girls. In February 1978, he was featured on the cover of Guitar: The Magazine for All Guitarists.

He performed on television and radio, including the BBC One show Parkinson and an ITV show called Frank Evans and Friends. As a composer and arranger, he worked on soundtracks for television drama and documentary programs.

Discography
 Mark Twain (1970)
 Stretching Forth (1971)
 In an English Manner (1972)
 Noctuary 1976)
 Soiree (1977)
 ...For Little Girls

With Tubby Hayes
 Jazz Tête à Tête (1966)

References

External links
 

1930 births
2007 deaths
English jazz guitarists
English male guitarists
British male jazz musicians
Musicians from Bristol
20th-century British male musicians